TDS Racing (Top Drive Services, also known as Pouchelon Racing) is a French racing team, currently competing in the European Le Mans Series, FIA World Endurance Championship and the 24 Hours of Le Mans.

History

Eurocup Mégane Trophy (2005-2013)

In 2005, TDS Racing, founded and run by Xavier Combet and Jacques Morello, entered the Eurocup Mégane Trophy for the first time, competing under the Pouchelon Racing banner with Ludovic Badey and Matthieu Cheruy. In the next year the team changed name to TDS. After eight years of running in the Mégane Trophy, the team had scored titles in both drivers' and teams championships. The first championship title was clinched by Michaël Rossi in 2008, who won races at Spa, Hungaroring and Estoril. In 2010, Nick Catsburg became another championship winner.

European Le Mans Series (2011-2016)

In 2011, the team purchased Oreca 03-Nissan car to compete in European Le Mans Series with Mathias Beche, Jody Firth, Pierre Thiriet. The team retained Beche and Thiriet for 2012 and took titles with them in drivers' and teams' championship. The team has competed in BMW Z4 GT3 in the GTC Class in 2015 with Eric Dermont, Dino Lunardi and Franck Perera. They became champions in both drivers' and teams' standings.

Blancpain Endurance Series (2013-2015)
From 2013 to 2015 TDS Racing competed in Blancpain Endurance Series, using BMW Z4 GT3. 2014 was their most successful season in the series, as the duo of Henry Hassid and Nick Catsburg won races at Circuit Paul Ricard and Nürburgring.

FIA World Endurance Championship (2017-)

TDS Racing purchased two Oreca 07-Gibson cars and will make debut in the LMP2 class of the FIA World Endurance Championship in 2017. Also the team will field one car under G-Drive Racing banner.

IMSA WeatherTech SportsCar Championship (2023-)

TDS Racing announced on September 28, 2022 that the team would be making a full-time effort in the LMP2 class of the IMSA WeatherTech SportsCar Championship in 2023.

References

External links
 

French auto racing teams
Auto racing teams established in 2005
2005 establishments in France
24 Hours of Le Mans teams
European Le Mans Series teams
FIA World Endurance Championship teams
WeatherTech SportsCar Championship teams
International GT Open teams
Blancpain Endurance Series teams